is a judicial decision of the United Kingdom Supreme Court relating to bank charges in the United Kingdom, with reference to the situation where a bank account holder goes into unplanned overdraft.

When a bank customer uses an unplanned overdraft and then makes a payment request (whether by standing order, direct debit or using an ATM or debit card), banks generally make the payment as requested, and then charge fees (which may include "paid item" charges and unauthorised overdraft fees) which accrue on a daily basis whilst the unauthorised overdraft continues.  The Office of Fair Trading ('OFT'), acting on behalf of consumers, challenged these fees under the Unfair Terms in Consumer Contracts Regulations 1999 ('UTCCR'), which implements European Union Unfair Contract Terms Directive. OFT claimed the sizeable fees charged were not a fair reflection of the banks' costs but were instead a penalty upon the consumer or bank account holder, hence unlawful. If these fees were confirmed to be a penalty for breach of contract then under UK law the amount that could be charged would be limited to reflect the actual (and considerably lower) costs which were incurred by the bank.

The High Court held that although the charges were not penal, they fell within the remit of the legislation and hence their fairness could be assessed by the OFT. The Court of Appeal agreed and held unanimously and emphatically that the charges could be assessed for fairness. But the UK Supreme Court reversed this decision, holding that the charges could not be assessed for fairness by the OFT, or the courts. They held that UTCCR 1999 r 6(2), as the United Kingdom chose to implement the European Directive, precluded any assessment of the "core terms" of a contract, and because overdraft fees related to a bank's remuneration, the fees charged to consumers could not be challenged. Baroness Hale asserted that while the court had no power to do anything, Parliament could have chosen to construe the directive more broadly, and it would be up to the legislature to decide differently. The Supreme Court denied any reference to the European Court of Justice (through art 234 TEC), so bringing to an end the litigation. The regulations could be challenged as failing to implement the directive through a separate case, but since any decision by the ECJ would be prospective only the government, and not the banks, would have to pay any compensation. This may be unlikely to succeed, since the Directive gives discretion to Member States to regulate all terms or non-core terms.

Facts

Abbey National, Barclays Bank, Clydesdale Bank, HBOS, HSBC Bank, Lloyds TSB, Nationwide Building Society and the Royal Bank of Scotland asked for declarations that their standard terms for charging customers were incapable of being penalties at common law. The OFT investigated charges where bank customers requested or instructed a bank to make a payment for which they had no necessary funds and was beyond an overdraft. The OFT argued that the breach of contract was not going into overdraft, but the customer telling his bank to go into overdraft. The bank argued that using a card without funds was a breach and therefore the charge was not penal.

Judgment

High Court
Andrew Smith J granted declarations for the banks. His ruling applied to "[un]paid item charges, paid item charges, overdraft excess charges, and guaranteed paid item charges"

The banks, engaging nine Queen's Counsels and fifteen other barristers, successfully established that the contractual terms were not penal, because the charge was not consequent on any breach of contract by a customer. The remaining question was then whether the charges fell foul of the Unfair Contract Terms Act 1977 (particularly s 6(2)) or the UTCCR.

Much was made by the banks of the clear, intelligible language used in the clauses in question. The judgment concluded that the language used was clear and intelligible in the contracts of HSBC, Lloyds TSB, Nationwide and RBSG; and similarly in the most part for Abbey National, Barclays, Clydesdale and HBOS although lacking in minor detail. It is unlikely that the relevant consumer protection law will be stifled by the conclusion of clear and intelligible language.

The banks attempted to establish that the statute is inapplicable to the charges in question. The essence of the argument submitted was that the charges are remuneration for the service provided by the bank (supplying a bank account) and so these particular contractual terms are not severable from the contract as a whole. This argument was rejected by the High Court.

The practical impact of this case is that customers can begin or continue claims against their banks and the lower courts will follow Office of Fair Trading v Abbey National plc and Others and assess the fairness of the clauses.

On penalties, Andrew Smith J said the following,

The banks appealed.

Court of Appeal
After submissions on the 8 October and 5 November 2008, a combined decision of Sir Anthony Clarke, Waller LJ and Lloyd LJ held emphatically that the OFT had the jurisdiction to assess the fairness of the banks' unplanned overdraft fees. It denied leave to appeal to the House of Lords.

Supreme Court
The banks petitioned the House of Lords (which was replaced by the Supreme Court on 1 October 2009) for permission to appeal on 25 March 2009, granted on 31 March. and the banks entered their appeal petition on 6 April 2009. After a hearing on 23–25 June 2009 by Lord Phillips of Worth Matravers, Lord Walker of Gestingthorpe, Baroness Hale of Richmond, Lord Mance, Lord Neuberger of Abbotsbury, judgment was handed down by the Supreme Court at 9.45am on Wednesday 25 November 2009, with the Supreme Court judges finding unanimously in favour of the banks. They held that the bank charges were a core term of the contracts for bank accounts, relating to the banks' remuneration. Therefore, under the authority by the OFT to assess the fairness of terms under UTCCR 1999 reg. 6(2), the unplanned overdraft were not capable of assessment.

Lord Mance stated the following in his decision:

See also

Unfair Contract Terms Act 1977
Unfair Terms in Consumer Contracts Regulations 1999
Bank charge
Interfoto v Stiletto [1989] QB 433
Director General of Fair Trading v First National Bank plc [2001] UKHL 52

Notes

References
E MacDonald, 'Bank Charges and the Core Exemption: Office of Fair Trading v Abbey National plc' (2008) 71(6) MLR 987-998

External links
Information page from the Financial Services Authority, giving clear guidance for consumers
'Bank charges can be assessed for fairness' (April 29, 2008) The Times
'Banks lose overdraft charges case' (April 24, 2008) BBC News

Supreme Court of the United Kingdom cases
English banking case law
Banking in the United Kingdom
Bank regulation
English unfair terms case law
2009 in case law
2009 in British law